Sadarghat Bridge is a bridge in Silchar city of Assam, India, which crosses the Barak River. This bridge is the only bridge built on the Barak River in Silchar city. The bridge is the only way to reach Kumbhirgram Airport, Silchar from Silchar.

References 

Bridges in Assam
Transport in Silchar